Rancheria River may refer to:

 Ranchería River, a river in the department of La Guajira, Colombia
 Rancheria River (Yukon), a river in the Yukon Territory, Canada
 Little Rancheria River, a tributary of Canada's Rancheria River

See also
 Rancheria Creek (disambiguation)
 Rancheria (disambiguation)